Alucita postfasciata is a moth of the family Alucitidae. It is found in Sri Lanka.

References

Moths described in 1910
Alucitidae
Moths of Sri Lanka